Rhinolaelaps is a genus of mites in the family Laelapidae.

Species
 Rhinolaelaps vitzthumio (Fonseca, 1935)

References

Laelapidae